Jean Cote, or Jean Côté, is a hamlet in northern Alberta, Canada within the Municipal District of Smoky River No. 130.

Demographics 
Jean Cote recorded a population of 65 in the 1991 Census of Population conducted by Statistics Canada.

See also 
List of communities in Alberta
List of hamlets in Alberta

References 

Hamlets in Alberta
Municipal District of Smoky River No. 130